The women's uneven bars final at the 2012 Olympic Games in London was held at the North Greenwich Arena on 6 August.

Aliya Mustafina of Russia won the gold medal, He Kexin of China won silver, and Beth Tweddle of Great Britain won bronze.

Format of competition

The top eight competitors in the qualification phase (with a limit of two per country) advanced to the final. Qualification scores were then ignored, with only final-round scores counting.

Qualification results

* Huang Qiushuang (CHN), ranked 7th, did not qualify to the final, and Jordyn Wieber (USA), ranked 12th, did not qualify as the 3rd reserve due to the two-per-country rule.

Final results

References

Gymnastics at the 2012 Summer Olympics
2012
2012 in women's gymnastics
Women's events at the 2012 Summer Olympics